The 2022 Leinster Senior Hurling Championship Final, was the deciding game of the 2022 Leinster Senior Hurling Championship, a hurling match that was played on 4 June at Croke Park, Dublin. It was contested by defending champions Kilkenny and Galway. Kilkenny captained by Richie Reid won their 74th Leinster title running out winners 0–22 to 0–17.

Details

References

Leinster Senior Hurling Championship Finals
Galway GAA matches
Kilkenny GAA matches